Aviva Ruth Burnstock (born 1959) is head of the Department of Art Conservation & Technology at the Courtauld Institute, London. Burnstock is a graduate of the University of Sussex (BSc. Neurobiology 1981) and took in 1991 a PhD at the Courtauld Institute 

In 2011 Burnstock was member of a team that confirmed in the BBC One television series Fake or Fortune? that the painting The Procuress in the Courtauld's collection – a version of a 1622 work by Dirck van Baburen now in the Museum of Fine Arts, Boston –  is an Oil paint-Bakelite forgery by Han van Meegeren made in the 1930s or 1940s. She has since made several appearances on the programme.

She is Fellow of the International Institute for Conservation.

Personal life 
She is the daughter of the neurobiologist Geoffrey Burnstock and married since 1989 to Hugh Sebag-Montefiore.

Selected publications
"The application of scanning electron microscopy (SEM) to the examination of painting materials with special reference to cleaning and blanching", Thesis (Ph.D.), Courtauld Institute of Art, University of London, 1991
"A technical study of Cassone panels from the Courtauld Gallery", Tilly Schmidt, Caroline Campbell, Aviva Burnstock, for Zietschrift für Kunsttechnologie und Koneserviereung ZKK 23/2 2010, 315-326, 
"Impressionist paintings In the Courtauld Gallery: making inferences from recent technical studies", Zietschrift für Kunsttechnologie und Koneserviereung ZKK 2009/1 72-79.
"Water sensitivity of modern artists’ oil paints", L. Mills, A. Burnstock, H. van Keulen, F. Duarte and K.J. van den Berg, ICOM Committee for Conservation 15th Triennial Meeting, New Delhi, 2008, .651-659. 
"A non-invasive XRF study supported by multivariate statistical analysis and reflectance FTIR to assess the composition of modern painting materials", Francesca Rossi, Aviva Burnstock, Klaas JanVan den Berg, Costanza Miliani, Brunetto Giovanni Brunetti and Antonio Sgamellotti, Spectrochimica Acta vol 71/5 2009, 1655-1662.
Painting in Britain, 1500-1630 : production, influences, and patronage. Cooper, Tarnya; Burnstock, Aviva; Howard, Maurice; Town, Edward, eds. (First ed.). Oxford: Oxford University Press. . OCLC 907131366.

References

Living people
Academics of the Courtauld Institute of Art
Conservator-restorers
Alumni of the University of Sussex
Alumni of the Courtauld Institute of Art
1959 births
British women non-fiction writers